Ketari is a state constituency in Pahang, Malaysia, that is represented in the Pahang State Legislative Assembly.

History

Polling districts 
According to the federal gazette issued on 31 October 2022, the Ketari constituency is divided into 13 polling districts.

Representation history

Demographics

Election results

References 

Pahang state constituencies